Miguel Paternain, C.Ss.R. (Minas, Uruguay, 16 November 1894 – 21 October 1970) was a Uruguayan Roman Catholic cleric.

Biography
Ordained 19 February 1921 in the Congregation of the Most Holy Redeemer, he was appointed Bishop of Melo in 1929; he was ordained bishop by the Apostolic Nuncio to Argentina, Archbishop Filippo Cortesi. In 1931 his diocese is renamed Diocese of Florida-Melo, and since then, Paternain has his see at the Cathedral of Florida. Finally, in 1955 is created the Diocese of Florida, which Paternain still holds.

After a very long, fruitful bishopric, in 1960 he resigns as Bishop of Florida; he is appointed titular bishop of Mades in February and, in September, titular archbishop of Achrida.

He passes away in 1970.

Bibliography
Juan Vicente Chiarino Los Obispos de un siglo, conferencia dictada en el Club Católico de Montevideo el 7 de setiembre de 1978, publicada en Libro Annual 1978–1979 del Instituto Teológico del Uruguay, Montevideo, 1979
Juan Villegas, Las Actividades Pastorales de los Obispos del Uruguay. 1878–1978, conferencia dictada en el Club Católico de Montevideo el 22 de junio de 1978, publicada en Libro Annual 1978–1979 del Instituto Teológico del Uruguay, Montevideo, 1979.

References

External links

1894 births
1970 deaths
People from Minas, Uruguay
Bishops appointed by Pope Pius XI
Redemptorist bishops
20th-century Roman Catholic bishops in Uruguay
Uruguayan Roman Catholic bishops
Roman Catholic bishops of Florida
Roman Catholic bishops of Melo
]